Coleophora retrodentella is a moth of the family Coleophoridae. It is found in the French and Italian Alps.

The larvae feed on Minuartia rostrata and Minuartia setacea. They create a case of about 5 mm long.

References

retrodentella
Moths of Europe
Moths described in 2004